American singer Shooter Jennings has released ten studio albums and four live albums. Active as a musician since 2001, he first released music in the band Stargunn, which issued one album in 2001. Jennings' solo debut, Put the "O" Back in Country, came out in 2005 and accounted for his only chart single to date, the George Jones collaboration "4th of July". This was his first album for Universal South Records (now Show Dog-Universal Music), while later releases have been on his own Black Country Rock Media label.

Albums

Studio albums

Stargunn albums

Live albums

Compilation albums

Singles

Other appearances

Digital exclusives

Albums

Black Ribbons: The Living Album

Videography

References

Rock music discographies
Discographies of American artists